Shlyuzovoy Bridge (Russian: Шлюзовой мост, Sluice (Lock) Bridge) is a concrete cantilever bridge in Moscow, Russia, spanning the eastern extremity of Vodootvodny Canal and connecting right-bank embankments of Moskva River. Existing bridge was completed in 1965 by engineer Z.V. Freydina.

History and specifications

In the 19th century the eastern end of Vodootvodny Canal was closed by a dam with locks, located about 150 meters west (upstream) from the tip of Balchug island. In 1930s, this dam was demolished as part of Moscow Canal project and replaced with a temporary bridge for trams and automobiles. This bridge was torn down upon completion of Bolshoy and Maly Krasnokholmsky Bridges (before World War II). 

Existing bridge was built in 1965 on a new site at the very tip of an island. This bridge looks like an arch bridge, but actually consists of two cantilevered consoles, extending 9.3 meters from the pillars, and a keystone center piece 14.0 meters long. Total length 49.8 meters, width 22.0 meters (including 15.0 meters automobile road).

See also
List of bridges in Moscow

References

Bridges in Moscow
Cantilever bridges
Bridges completed in 1965
Bridges built in the Soviet Union